Stadion is an urban neighborhood of Belgrade, the capital of Serbia. It is located in Belgrade's municipality of Savski Venac.

Location 

Stadion is located just west of the neighborhood of Autokomanda. It also borders the neighborhoods of Dedinje to the west, Diplomatska Kolonija to the south and Voždovac to the east. It is bordered by the Ljutice Bogdana and Dr Milutina Ivkovica streets and the Boulevard of prince Alexander Karađorđević. In between, it also includes the streets of Maglajska, Sime Lukina Lazića, Ružićeva, Jezdićeva and Šekspirova.

Characteristics 

Stadion is a small neighborhood, named so because it spreads between two largest football stadiums in Belgrade (stadion, Serbian for stadium), those of Partizan and Crvena Zvezda (Marakana). The area is entirely residential, with two small parks on its ends, elongated one along the boulevard and triangular one, pointed to Autokomanda.

The larger of two parks spreads along the Prince Alexander Karađorđević Boulevard. The plane tree avenue along the modern Dr Milutina Ivkovica Street was planted in the first half of the 1930s.

Due to its location within the wider sports complex which includes two major stadiums, and being a sub-neighborhood of the Belgrade's most affluent neighborhood of Dedinje, the real estate in Stadion are quite pricey, with high taxation.

References 

Neighborhoods of Belgrade
Savski Venac